Kim Seul-ki (born 6 November 1992) is a South Korean footballer who plays as winger for Gyeongnam FC in K League Classic.

Career
He was selected by Gyeongnam FC in the 2014 K League draft.

References

External links 

1992 births
Living people
Association football wingers
South Korean footballers
Gyeongnam FC players
K League 1 players
K League 2 players